The 2020 United States Shadow Senator election in the District of Columbia took place on November 3, 2020, to elect a shadow member to the United States Senate to represent the District of Columbia. The member was only recognized by the District of Columbia and not officially sworn or seated by the United States Senate. Paul Strauss won election to a fifth term with the largest percentage and amount of votes in his career.

Primary elections
The party primaries took place on June 2, 2020. Because of the ongoing COVID-19 pandemic voting by mail was encouraged. Democrat Paul Strauss, the incumbent shadow senator, and D.C. Statehood Green candidate Eleanor Ory were unopposed in their party primaries. Cornelia Weiss won a write-in campaign in the Republican primary.

General election
The general election took place on November 3, 2020.

Candidates
 Eleanor Ory (D.C. Statehood Green)
 Paul Strauss (Democratic), incumbent
 Cornelia Weiss (Republican)

Results

References

External links
 
 
  (Affiliate of the U.S. League of Women Voters)
 

Official campaign websites
 Paul Strauss (D) for Senate

United States Shadow Senator
2020